James "Jim" Gerald Drake (20 February 1931 – 8 October 2008) was an English professional rugby league footballer who played in the 1950s and 1960s.

Background
Jim Drake was born in Workington, Cumberland, England, he was the older (by 10-minutes) twin brother of fellow rugby league footballer; Bill Drake. Jim Drake died aged 77 in Hull, East Riding of Yorkshire, England.

Playing career
Through injury, Drake missed Hull FC's 10-9 victory over Halifax in the Championship Final during the 1955–56 season at Maine Road, Manchester on Saturday 12 May 1956.

Drake played right-, i.e. number 10, for English League XIII while at Hull in the 8-26 defeat by France on Saturday 22 November 1958 at Knowsley Road, St. Helens.

Drake played right-, i.e. number 10, in Hull FC's 13-30 defeat by Wigan in the 1959 Challenge Cup Final during the 1958–59 season at Wembley Stadium, London on Saturday 9 May 1959.

Drake won a cap for Great Britain while at Hull in 1960 against France.

Drake played right-, i.e. number 10, in Hull Kingston Rovers' 2-12 defeat by Hunslet in the 1962 Yorkshire County Cup Final during the 1962–63 season at Headingley Rugby Stadium, Leeds on Saturday 27 October 1962.

Drake played right-, i.e. number 10, in Hull Kingston Rovers' 13–10 victory over Huddersfield in the Eastern Division Championship Final during the 1962–63 season at Headingley Rugby Stadium, Leeds on Saturday 10 November 1962.

Drake also represented Cumberland.

References

External links
!Great Britain Statistics at englandrl.co.uk (statistics currently missing due to not having appeared for both Great Britain, and England)
Jim Drake: Tough rugby league prop for Hull and Great Britain
(archived by web.archive.org) Stats → Past Players → D at hullfc.com (statistics for player surnames beginning with 'C' and 'D' swapped)
(archived by web.archive.org) Statistics at hullfc.com

1931 births
2008 deaths
Cumberland rugby league team players
English rugby league players
Great Britain national rugby league team players
Hull F.C. players
Hull Kingston Rovers players
Rugby league fullbacks
Rugby league locks
Rugby league players from Workington
Rugby league props
Rugby league second-rows
Rugby League XIII players
English twins
Twin sportspeople